Barten Holyday or Holiday (1593 – 2 October 1661) was an English clergyman, author and poet.

Career 
He was educated at Christ Church, Oxford and earned a Doctor of Divinity degree. He entered the clergy in 1615; he was appointed Archdeacon of Oxford by King Charles I in 1626. Technogamia was his only play. In 1618, the year it was produced, Holyday served as Sir Francis Stewart's chaplain on Stewart's embassy to Spain. Holyday translated the Odes of Horace and works of Juvenal and Persius, and wrote A Survey of the World, in Verse (1661), plus sermons and miscellaneous works. He was summed up by one commentator as "a good scholar, a shrewd critic, and a fair wit." His translations show strong fidelity to their originals, and have often been considered the best of his works. Samuel Johnson said in Idler 69 that his translations were those of "only a scholar and a critick" not a poet.

He was subject of a derisory poem called "Whoop Holiday", published in 1625 by Peter Heylin

Personal life 
Holyday died at Iffley in Oxfordshire on 2 October 1661, "of the new epidemicall disease that rageth now abroad" and was buried at Christchurch Cathedral, Oxford.

References

1593 births
1661 deaths
17th-century English clergy
Archdeacons of Oxford
English male dramatists and playwrights